SS George Dewey was a Liberty ship built in the United States during World War II. She was named after George Dewey, the only person in United States history to obtain the rank Admiral of the Navy. Dewey was a graduate of the United States Naval Academy and fought in both the American Civil War and the Spanish–American War.

Construction
George Dewey was laid down on 8 May 1943, under a Maritime Commission (MARCOM) contract, MC hull 1202, by the St. Johns River Shipbuilding Company, Jacksonville, Florida; she was sponsored by Rear Admiral Walter Browne Woodson, she was launched on 5 August 1943.

History
She was allocated to American Export Lines Inc., on 27 August 1943. On 1 January 1948, she was placed in the Hudson River Reserve Fleet, Jones Point, New York. On 31 May 1952, she was laid up in the National Defense Reserve Fleet, Beaumont, Texas. She was turned over for use as an artificial reef, on 6 August 1975, to the state of Texas. She was withdrawn from the fleet, 12 August 1975.

References

Bibliography

 
 
 
 
 

 

Liberty ships
Ships built in Jacksonville, Florida
1943 ships
Hudson River Reserve Fleet
Beaumont Reserve Fleet
Ships sunk as artificial reefs
Maritime incidents in 1976